Schoenus brevifolius, known as zig-zag bog-rush, is a species of sedge native to Australia, New Zealand, New Caledonia, and the Ogasawara (Bonin) Islands. It was first described by Robert Brown in 1810.

References

External links
Schoenus brevifolius occurrence data from GBIF

brevifolius
Plants described in 1810
Flora of Australia
Flora of New Zealand
Flora of New Caledonia
Flora of the Bonin Islands
Taxa named by Robert Brown (botanist, born 1773)